Captain America and Nick Fury: The Otherworld War is a 68-page, one-shot comic book, published by Marvel Comics in 2001.

Publication history
The comic was written by Peter K. Hogan and published in October 2001.

Plot
Taking place during World War II, the story features Captain America and Nick Fury. They join forces to take out the head of Hydra, Red Skull, as he has stolen a mysterious secret weapon. When the Nazis trigger a gateway to the Dark Dimension, Captain America and Nick Fury find themselves face-to-face with Dormammu, an extra-dimensional mutant, born to a race of powerful beings made of pure energy, known as The Faltine.

Reception
Upon its release, the book was the highest-selling trade paperback in North America, selling 17,785 copies in August 2001. 

SuperMegaMonkey of Comics Chronology stated that "the art is decently good, but that the story leaves things to desire". THE DAILY P.O.P's reviewer opined that "The artwork by Leonardo Manco is quite stunning and fits the level of drama perfectly as Hogan’s script is both entertaining and subtle.

See also
 2001 in comics

References

External links

Captain America titles
Nick Fury titles
Marvel Comics set during World War II